The Federal University of Paraná (UFPR) is a public university headquartered in Curitiba, Paraná, Brazil. UFPR is considered to be one of the oldest universities in Brazil.

UFPR ranks as 37th best university in Latin-America and it is among the 651-700 best universities in the world, according to QS World University Rankings. It is placed as the eighth best university in Brazil in the latest "Ranking Universitário Folha (RUF)", published by the nation's largest newspaper.

Nowadays, its facilities are spread over the capital Curitiba and other cities of the State of Paraná. It offers 124 undergraduate degree courses, 44 doctorate, 66 masters and 5 professional masters programs, apart from a number of lato sensu programs (mostly paid one-year specializations) - see Higher-ed degrees in Brazil.

History

In 1892, José Francisco da Rocha Pombo, an intellectual of the state of Paraná would have initiated the construction of the university, but his project was frustrated by the Federalist Movement.

Twenty years later, Paraná had a reduced number of intellectuals (nine doctors and four engineers), but it was in true development because of the production of the yerba mate.

Moreover, at this time, the Contestado War appeared as an incentive to the efforts of political leaderships concerning the creation of a university. In this context, Victor Ferreira do Amaral, deputy and director of public instruction of Paraná, started the effective creation of the university.

On December 19, 1912, the university was established and, in 1913, it has initiated its activities as a private institution in an old building situated on Comendador Araújo street. The first courses offered were Juridical and Social Sciences, Engineering, Medicine and Surgery, Commerce, Dentistry, Pharmacy and Obstetrics. After the establishment of the university, Victor Ferreira do Amaral, who was also its first president, initiated the construction of a central building in a land donated by the municipal government.

Due to the economic recession caused by the World War I, difficulties started to appear. In 1920, a federal law determined the closing of all universities. In a contradictory measure, the federal government created the Universidade do Rio de Janeiro, currently Universidade Federal do Rio de Janeiro (Federal University of Rio de Janeiro). The alternative to this law was to split the UFPR in several colleges.

Throughout several years, efforts in order to restore the university took place. Only in the beginning of the fifties the colleges were reunited once again in the University of Paraná, its federalization happening just after that, in 1951, when the university became a public and free-of-charge institution.

After its federalization, a process of expansion began with the construction of the Clinic's Hospital (Portuguese: Hospital de Clínicas da Universidade Federal do Paraná) in 1953, the Reitoria Campus in 1958 and the Polytechnic Center in 1961. The Polytechnic Center campus occupies .

Historical Building

The construction placed in the Santos Andrade Square began to be built in 1913, being a project of the military engineer Baeta de Faria. Its inauguration occurred in 1915.

Seven years later, in 1923, two lateral parts were added, according to the original project. The building of the right sector was ended in 1925 and was designated to the Engineering graduation course. In the following year, the left sector had been finalized and it passed to serve the Dentistry course. Other additions were made to the right side of the building and it has received in its totality new paint in 1940. The building was extended towards XV de Novembro Street and, in 1952, new works in the right section led to the demolition of part of the lateral façade built in 1940.

In 1954, the building occupied a whole block between the Santos Andrade Square, XV de Novembro Street, Presidente Faria Street and Alfredo Bufren Lane. The last modifications were made: a new façade with several columns and a wide set of staircases were projected and the covered dome was eliminated. The inauguration of the neoclassical, 17,000 square meter building, took place in 1955.

In the year on 1999, the mayor of Curitiba signed a law that made this building the official symbol of the city.

Academics

Undergraduate programs

Master Programs 

 Physical Education
 Pharmacology
 Biochemistry
 Genetics
 Zoology
 Botany
 Child and Teenager Health
 Pharmaceutical Sciences
 Surgery
 Internal Medicine and Health Sciences
 Nursery
 Geodesic Sciences
 Geology
 Geography
 Coastal and Oceanic Systems
 Environmental Development
 Applied Mathematics
 Information Systems
 Chemistry
 Physics
 Education
 Anthropology
 Sociology
 History
 Philosophy
 Psychology
 Languages and Literature
 Design
 Music
 Economical Development
 Business Administration
 Accounting and Finance
 Law
 Numerical Methods for Engineering
 Water Resources and Environmental Engineering
 Biotechnological Process
 Food Engineering
 Inter-disciplinary Themes on Engineering
 Electrical Engineering
 Civil Engineering
 Mechanical Engineering
 Chemical Engineering
 Political Sciences
 Bioinformatics
 Teaching of Environmental Science

Doctoral programs

Technical High School

Besides the above-mentioned courses, it offers high school education through its Technical High School.

Admissions

Students are admitted by an entrance exam, known as the vestibular, which consists of two parts:

Part I is composed of 80 multiple-choice questions including nine questions of each of the following subjects: Portuguese, Literature, Chemistry, Mathematics, Physics, Geography, History and Biology, plus eight questions of a foreign language which can be chosen from English, French, Spanish, German or Italian.

Over 50,000 people apply every year and sit for exactly the same exam. After two weeks time or so, 15,000 are called to take the Part II (or Phase II) written exams.

Part II is composed of a Portuguese test which covers five (previously seven) compulsory writing essays. Certain courses require that the candidate take an additional one or two exams involving open-questions in Chemistry, Mathematics, Physics, Geography, History, Biology, Philosophy or Sociology, the specific exam choice being determined by correlation between the subject and each major course. Engineering candidates, for example, take Mathematics and Physics tests.

The wait for the results of Part II is much longer and the results may take something between 4 and 7 weeks. A list with all the admitted candidates comes out usually in the middle of January—on the same day as the Mud-bath Party sponsored by the Central Directory of Students (Portuguese: Diretório Central dos Estudantes, DCE) occurs.

Laboratories 
 Centro de Documentação e Pesquisa de História dos Domínios Portugueses – CEDOPE
 Centro de Capacitação e Consultoria do Departamento de Ciência e Gestão da Informação do Setor de Ciências Sociais Applicadas – 3CGI
 Centro de Ciência de Segurança Computacional - CCSC
 Centro de Computação Científica e Software Livre – C3SL
 Centro de Estudos do Mar - CEM
 Centro de Microscopia Eletrônica – CME
 Centro de Pesquisa e Processamento de Alimentos – CEPPA
 Ciências Sociais Applicadas – CCCGI
 Centro de Estudos de Engenharia Civil Prof. inaldo Ayres Vieira – CESEC
 Grupo IMAGO de Pesquisa em Visão Computacional, Processamento de Imagens e Computação Gráfica
 Instituto de Tecnologia para o Desenvolvimento – LACTEC
 Laboratório de Análises Clínicas veterinárias
 Laboratório de Acústica e conforto Ambiental
 Laboratório de Eletroquímica de Superfícies e Corrosão – LESC
 Laboratório de Estudos em Monitoramento e Modelagem Ambiental – LEMMA
 Laboratório de Ictiologia Estuarina - Ictiologia UFPR
 Laboratório de Inventário Florestal
 Laboratório de Minerais e Rochas – LAMIR
 Laboratório de Nutrição Animal do Departamento de Zootecnia
 Laboratório de Paisagismo
 Laboratório de Parasitologia Clínica Veterinária - LPCV
 Laboratório de Pesquisas Hidrogeológicas – LPH
 Laboratório de Proteção Florestal
 Laboratório de Matriz Extracelular e Biotecnologia de Venenos
 Laboratório de Neurobiologia
 Laboratório de Citogenética Humana
 Laboratório de Genética Molecular Humana – LGMH
 Laboratório de Metabolismo Celular
 Laboratório de Imunogenética e Histocompatibilidade
 Laboratório de Óptica de Raios-X e Instrumentação – LORXI
 Laboratório de Superfícies e Interfaces – LSI
 Laboratório de Genética de Microorganismos – LabGeM
 Laboratório de Bioquimíca e Biofísica de Macromoléculas
 Laboratório de Anestesia e Analgesia Veterinária - LABEST
 Núcleo de Fixação de Nitrogênio - NFIX 
 Núcleo de Redes sem Fio e Redes Avançadas - NR2

And many more

Libraries 
The university has over 400,000 books and theses as well as thousand of periodicals that, for now, can't be accessed through its intranet, but will be in the future.

Campi 
In Curitiba

 Campus Juvevê
 Campus Batel
 Campus Centro
 Campus Reitoria
 Campus Ciências Agrárias/Cabral
 Campus III/Centro Politécnico
 Campus III/Escola Técnica
 Campus III/Jardim Botânico

Other cities
 Campus Palotina – Palotina
 Campus Estudos do Mar – Pontal do Paraná
 Campus Litoral – Matinhos
 Campus Jandaia do Sul – Jandaia do Sul

Publications 
 Archives of Veterinary Science
 Acta Biologica Paranaense
 Boletim Paranaense de Geociências
 Educar em Revista
 Jornal de Ciências do Exercício e do Esporte
 Jornal do Hospital das Clínicas
 Revista de Ciências Humanas
 Revista de Sociologia e Política
 Revista do Departamento e Programa de Pós-Graduação
 Revista Eletrônica de Musicologia
 Revista Floresta
 Revista Interação
 Revista Letras
 Scientia Agraria
 Revista de Engenharia Térmica

Notable alumni 
 Blairo Maggi — agrobusiness entrepreneur
 Clèmerson Merlin Clève — jurist, lawyer, and entrepreneur
 Dalton Trevisan — writer, Camões Prize winner        
 Daniel Przybysz — radiation oncologist
 Edson Fachin — jurist, lawyer
 Edith Fanta — Antarctic researcher
Enedina Alves Marques — civil engineer, first Black woman to receive an engineering degree in Brazil
Henry Bugalho — philosopher and writer
 Jaime Lerner — governor of Paraná (1995-2002)
 Jorge Reis-Filho — scientist
 Laurentino Gomes — writer and journalist, Jabuti Prize winner
 Marçal Justen Filho — jurist, lawyer
 Newton da Costa — logician and mathematician
 Roberto Requião — governor of Paraná (2003-2010) and senator since 2011 
 Tirone E. David — medical doctor
 Wilson Martins — politician (Governor of Piauí from April 1, 2010, to April 2, 2014.)

See also
Brazil University Rankings
Universities and Higher Education in Brazil

References

Further reading
 Official brochure

External links

  

 
Educational institutions established in 1912
Buildings and structures in Curitiba
Forestry education
1912 establishments in Brazil
Parana
Universities and colleges in Curitiba